Elephantitus of the Night is a compilation album by godheadSilo, released on February 10, 1995 by Kill Rock Stars.

Track listing

Personnel 

godheadSilo
 Dan Haugh – drums
 Mike Kunka – bass guitar

Technical personnel
 godheadSilo – mixing
 Tim Green – recording, mixing
 Michael Lastra – recording
 Owen Murphy – recording (8)
 Joe Preston – recording (5-8)

Release history

References

External links 
 

1995 compilation albums
GodheadSilo albums
Kill Rock Stars compilation albums